'Rod Abernethy is a performing songwriter, guitarist, and composer. His music has been used as scores for EA, Midway, Vivendi, Universal, Sony, Ubisoft, Bethesda, Paramount, Disney, THQ, Activision, Konami, Majesco Entertainment, NC Soft, Namco and Nintendo.

Abernethy first appeared on the public landscape with a 1975 LP Solo, produced by Don Dixon from the North Carolina band Arrogance. He later joined Arrogance as lead guitarist, staying with the band through their releases Suddenly (Warner Brothers,1980) and Lively (1981). He eventually left Arrogance before the recording of the unreleased, at the time, The 5'11" Record (1982) to pursue a solo music career composing for films, TV, and video games.

As a composer, Abernethy has more than 80 video games to his credit, including id Software's RAGE, TERA, EA’s science fiction survival horror opus Dead Space (2009 BAFTA AWARD for Best Original Score), Tolkien's The Hobbit for Vivendi Universal, Alpha Protocol, The Wheelman, Blacksite: Area 51, Star Trek: Legacy, Blazing Angels: Squadrons of WWII, and Dead Head Fred.

Selected works

 The Man I'm Supposed To Be Rod Abernethy, Songs From Downstairs Records
 Damaged Core High Voltage Software, Oculus Rift
 Adventure Time Vicious Cycle, Cartoon Network
 Pacific Rim Warner Bros.
 RAGE  id Software, Bethesda
 Despicable Me  D3 Publisher, Vicious Cycle Software
 Earth Defense Force: Insect Armageddon  D3 Publisher, Vicious Cycle Software
 TERA: Rising  Bluehole Studios, En Masse Entertainment
 Dead Space Electronic Arts
 Wheelman  Midway/Ubisoft
 Darksiders Promotional Trailer, THQ
 Eat Lead  D3Publisher
 Alpha Protocol  Obsidian, Sega
 Transformers Animated  Activision
 Dead Head Fred  D3Publisher
 Hour of Victory  Midway
 Horsez  Ubisoft
 Star Trek: Encounters  Bethesda, Paramount
 The Hobbit Vivendi Universal Games, Sierra Entertainment
 Blazing Angels Ubisoft
 Lineage II, Scions of Destiny Promotional Trailer,NC Soft
 Gauntlet: Seven Sorrows Midway
 Rayman Raving Rabbids Ubisoft
 Flushed Away D3Publishing of America
 Warhawk Promotional Trailers, SCEA
 Rise and Fall: Civilizations at War Stainless Steel Studios
 Prince of Persia: The Two Thrones Promotional Trailers, Ubisoft
 Heroes of Might and Magic V Promotional Trailers, Ubisoft
 Jaws Unleashed Majesco
 Pac-Man World Rally Namco
 Unaccounted IV Audiofonics
 Area 51 Midway
 Rise of the Kasai Sony Computer Entertainment America
 King Arthur Konami, Touchstone Pictures
 The Sims Bustin' Out Electronic Arts, Maxis
 The Urbz Electronic Arts, Maxis
 Wars and Warriors: Joan of Arc Enlight Software
 Star Wars Trilogy: Apprentice of the Force Ubisoft
 Curious George Vicious Cycle, Nickelodeon
 Shinobi THQ
 Altered Beast THQ
 Atlantis The Lost Continent Disney, THQ
 Cabela’s Big Game Hunter Activision
 Dark Side Of The Moon SouthPeak Games
 Ellis Island The History Channel
 Looney Tunes Assorted Nuts Warner Bros.
 Marvel Universe  Konami
 Marvel: Dark Reign  Vicious Cycle, D3Publisher
 Monster Garage Activision
 Tejumin SouthPeak Games
 Wild Wild West Warner Bros. Interactive
 Zathura'' Take 2 Interactive

References

External links
 Rod Abernethy - Performing Songwriter
 
 Rod Abernethy on Facebook
 Rod Abernethy featured in the News & Observer
 Live Orchestra for The Hobbit

Year of birth missing (living people)
21st-century American composers
American male composers
Living people
Video game composers
21st-century American male musicians